Projapyx stylifer is a species of two-pronged bristletail in the family Projapygidae.

References

Diplura
Articles created by Qbugbot